Makum  is a railway junction station on the Lumding–Dibrugarh section. It is located in Tinsukia district in the Indian state of Assam. It serves Makum and the surrounding areas.

History
The -wide metre-gauge line from Dibrugarh steamer ghat to Makum was opened to passenger traffic on 16 July 1883.

The metre-gauge railway track earlier laid by Assam Bengal Railway from Chittagong to Lumding was extended to Tinsukia on the Dibru–Sadiya line in 1903.

Conversion of the Lumding–Dibrugarh section from metre gauge to  broad gauge was completed by the end of 1997.

References

External links
 

Railway junction stations in India
Railway stations in Tinsukia district
Tinsukia railway division